"There She Goes" is a song co-written and performed by American contemporary R&B musician Babyface, issued as the lead single from his sixth studio album Face2Face. Produced and co-written by The Neptunes, it was the first single Babyface released that he did not produce himself. The song peaked at number 31 on the Billboard Hot 100 in 2001, making it his last Top 40 entry to date.

Music video

The official music video for the song was directed by Hype Williams.

Personnel
Credits adapted from album liner notes.

Babyface: lead vocals, background vocals, writer, bass
The Neptunes: producers, instruments
Pharrell Williams: writer, background vocals
Chad Hugo: writer
Latrelle Simmons: background vocals
Wayne Lindsey: electric piano
Paul Boutin: recording engineer
Jean-Marie Horvat: mix engineer
Josean Posey: assistant mix engineer

Charts

Weekly charts

Year-end charts

References

External links
 
 

2001 songs
2001 singles
Arista Records singles
Babyface (musician) songs
Music videos directed by Hype Williams
Song recordings produced by the Neptunes
Songs written by Babyface (musician)
Songs written by Chad Hugo
Songs written by Pharrell Williams
Hip hop soul songs